Narratage is a 2017 Japanese romantic drama film directed by Isao Yukisada, starring Jun Matsumoto, Kasumi Arimura, Kentaro Sakaguchi, Mikako Ichikawa and Kōji Seto. It is an adaptation of the Rio Shimamoto novel .

Cast
 Jun Matsumoto as Takashi Hayama
 Kasumi Arimura as Izumi Kudo
 Kentaro Sakaguchi as Reiji Ono
  as Shio Yamada
  as Hirofumi Kurokawa
  as Yuzuko Tsukamoto
  as Iori Kaneda
  as Kei Shindo
 Mikako Ichikawa as Mizuki Hayama
 Kōji Seto as Keita Miyazawa

Release
It was released in theatres in Japan on 7 October 2017.

Reception
Guy Lodge of Variety wrote that while the film is "fully in touch with its very real emotions", it "feels just a little more than it says."

Edmund Lee of the South China Morning Post rated the film 2.5 stars out of 5 and wrote that "for all its finer accomplishments, Yukisada’s effort has probably stepped too far out of the line of ethics to find an agreeable audience."

Elizabeth Kerr of The Hollywood Reporter wrote that the film is a "mess on the storytelling front" and that it "basks in shameless sentimentality".

References

External links
 
 

Japanese romantic drama films
2017 romantic drama films